is a Japanese writer, whose works have been adapted into other formats, including films, manga, and anime.

Life and career 
Sakemi was born in Kurume, Fukuoka Prefecture.
In 1988, In 1988 he graduated from Aichi University, Faculty of Letters, Department of Philosophy with a major in Eastern philosophy.

In 1989, he won the 1st Japan Fantasy Novel Award for Kōkyū Shōsetsu, and published it as his first novel by Shinchosha.
The following year, this novel made into the anime television film Like the Clouds, Like the Wind. 

Bokkō, published in 1992, was adapted into a manga and a film was made based on it.
As for Bokkō, Studio Ghibli once considered making an anime film directed by Mamoru Oshii around 1991, and even created imageboards by Katsuya Kondō, but the plan fell through.

His first novel was a fantasy set in a fictional dynasty similar to China, but since then he has often taken subjects from actual Chinese history. He is known for his uninhibited imagination, while keeping historical facts in mind.

Awards and Nominations 
 1989 - Winner of the 1st Japan Fantasy Novel Award: Kōkyū Shōsetsu
 1990 - Nominated for the 102nd Naoki Prize: Kōkyū Shōsetsu
 1991 - Nominated for the 104th Naoki Prize: Bokkō
 1992 - Winner of the Atsushi Nakajima Memorial Award 50 years after his death: Bokkō, Rōkō ni Ari, Pythagoras no Tabi
 2000 - Winner of the 19th Jirō Nitta Literary Award: Shūkōtan

Bibliography

Novels 
, 1989
, 1991
, complete in 13 volumes, 1992-2002
, 1995
, 1998
, 1999
, complete in 5 volumes, 2004 - 2017

Short story collections 
, 1991
, 1991
, 2010

Essays 
, 2007

Adaptations

Films 
 A Battle of Wits, 2006
 A Japanese-Chinese-Korean co-production based on Hideki Mori's manga version, the film was released in Asia in 2006 and in Japan on February 3, 2007.

Anime 
 , 1990
 An anime television film based on Kōkyū Shōsetsu, broadcast on Nippon Television Network System on March 21, 1990.

Manga
 , (Original story by Ken'ichi Sakemi, Illustration by Hideki Mori, scenario cooperation by Sentarō Kubota), complete in 11 volumes
 A manga based on Bokkō. It was serialized in Big Comic from 1992 to 1996. It became an original storyline along the way, expanding on ideas from the novel.
 , (Story by Ken'ichi Sakemi, Art by Katsuya Kondō), up to 2 volumes
 Original manga work without a novel as a basis. It was serialized in Animage from the August 1994 issue to the August 1995 issue, and then stopped. Unfinished.
 , (Original story: Ken'ichi Sakemi, Manga: Jun Hanyunyū), complete in 3 volumes
 A manga based on Rōkō ni Ari. It was serialized in the monthly web comic magazine "Digicomi Shincho com2" from 2007.
 , (Original story: Ken'ichi Sakemi, Manga: Tabasa Iori), complete in 3 volumes
 A manga based on Nakimushi Yowamushi Shokatsu Kōmei. It was serialized in Monthly Big Comic Spirits from the December 2017 issue to the July 2019 issue.

References

External links
 Sakemi Ken'ichi Fan no Page
 

1963 births
20th-century Japanese novelists
21st-century Japanese novelists
Living people
Manga artists
People from Kurume
Aichi University alumni